Salak (Salacca zalacca) is a species of palm tree (family Arecaceae) native to Java and Sumatra in Indonesia. It is cultivated in other regions of Indonesia as a food crop, and reportedly naturalized in Bali, Lombok, Timor, Maluku, and Sulawesi.

The salak Salacca glabrecens was featured on a Malaysian stamp, issued 27 February 1999 under the rare fruits series of stamps.

The fruits grow in clusters at the base of the palm, and are also known as snakeskin fruit due to the reddish-brown scaly skin. They are about the size and shape of a ripe fig, with a distinct tip. The pulp is edible. The fruit can be peeled by pinching the tip, which should cause the skin to slough off so it can be pulled away. The fruit inside consists of three lobes with the two larger ones, or even all three, containing a large inedible seed. The lobes resemble, and have the consistency of, large peeled garlic cloves. The taste is usually sweet and acidic, with a strong astringent edge, but its apple-like texture can vary from very dry and crumbly (salak pondoh from Yogyakarta) to moist and crunchy (salak Bali).

Cultivation
The salak tree has been cultivated throughout Indonesia, and there are at least 30 cultivars, most of which have an astringent taste and are sweet. Two popular cultivars are salak pondoh from Yogyakarta province (found in 1980s) and salak Bali from Bali.

Salak pondoh
Salak pondoh is an important fruit in the Yogyakarta province on the island of Java. In the five years to 1999, the annual production in Yogyakarta doubled to 28,666 tons. Its popularity (compared with other cultivars) among local Indonesian consumers is mainly due to the intensity of its aroma and its sweet flavor even before reaching full maturity.

Salak pondoh has three more superior variations, namely pondoh super, pondoh hitam (black pondoh), and pondoh gading (ivory / yellowish-skinned pondoh).

Salak Bali
Believed to originate from Sibetan village, in the highlands of Bali. Salak Bali is commonly sold all over the island of Bali, and is a popular fruit with both locals and tourists.

It is the only monoecious salacca and one of the few monoecious palms in the Calameae clade.

There are more than 15 varieties of Salak Bali, with tastes ranging from sweet as sugar (Salak Gula Pasir), sweet-sour like a grapefruit (Salak Getih) and sour like a pineapple (Salak Nanas).
The fruit is roughly the size of a large fig, and has a crunchy and moist consistency. 
In some varieties the fruit has a slight astringent, starchy mouthfeel such as with Salak Gading; with other fruits such as Salak Gondok and Salak Gula Pasir, there is little to no astringency.

Salak gula pasir
The most expensive cultivar of the Bali salak is the gula pasir (literally "sand sugar" or "grain sugar", referring to its fine-grainedness), which is smaller than the normal salak and is the sweetest of all salak. The price in Bali is Rp 15,000-30,000 (US$1.00-2.00) per kilogram depending on time of year.

As this variety of salak is known for its sweetness, it is sometimes fermented into Salak wine which has an alcohol content of 13.5 percent, similar to traditional wine made from grapes.

Gallery

References

Further reading

 

Salacca
Fruits originating in Asia
Tropical fruit
Trees of Sumatra
Trees of Java
Plants described in 1791
Edible plants